Ādurgari is a secret language of the nomadic Shaikh Mohammadi group of peddlers of east Afghanistan, used especially in the presence of outsiders. It is taught to children starting at the age of six or seven; all adults speak it in addition to their native Dari. The name is apparently derived from a word referring to their activity of peddling (ādur), and it has tentatively been suggested this might indicate a possible connection with the Harduri people of Uzbekistan.

The following five words are attested in the language: čamlai 'bread', danab 'girl, woman', duka 'house', lām 'meat', and rašuk 'man'.

References

Languages of Afghanistan
Cant languages